Al Kharaitiyat Sport Club is a Qatari sports club based in the town of Al Kharaitiyat, best known for its football team of the Qatari Second Division. They won the Second Division in 2004 and played in the Qatari Stars League the following season. However, they were relegated the following season. They once again regained their position in the top flight in the 2008–09 season.

History
Al Kharaitiyat is among the newest sports clubs in Qatar, having been formed in 1996 as Al-Hilal. Among the founders were:

Upon its formation, it was entered into the Qatari Second Division. After winning the second division title in 2004, they earned a spot in the top tier. Shortly after, the club was renamed to its current name, Al Kharaitiyat, on 19 October 2004 by a decision of the vice-president of the Qatar Olympic Committee in order to better represent the district it is located in. In 2008 the team was promoted to the Qatar Stars League.

Supporters
A fan club was established in 2008 after the team won promotion to the Qatar Stars League.

Stadium history

Honours

 Domestic

Qatari Second Division

 Winners (2): 2004, 2020

Qatari Stars Cup
 Runners-up (1): 2012

Current squad
As of Qatari Second Division:

Personnel

Club staff
Last updated 11 November 2018.

Management

Managerial history

Last updated 20 May 2021.

 Mokhtar Mokhtar (2003–2005)
 João Francisco (2005)
 José Roberto Souza (2005–2006)
 Ayman Mansour (2006–2007)
 Luisinho Lemos (2007–2008)
 Rodion Gačanin (2008)
 Moscofetch Nebojsa (2008)
 Nebojša Vučković (2008)
 José Roberto Souza (2008) (CT)
 Bernard Simondi (2008–2011)
 Arturzinho (2009) (CT)
 Lutfi Benzarti (2011)
 Laurent Banide (2012)
 Bernard Simondi (2012–2013)
 Bertrand Marchand (2013–2014)
 Yasser Sibai (2014)
 Amar Osim (2014–2016)
 Ahmad Al-Ajlani (2016–2018)
 Nacif Beyaoui (2018)
 Aziz El Amri (2018)
 Yousuf Adam (2018–present)

Notes
Note 1: Sheikh Hamad bin Thamer Al Thani served as the first president of the club.

References

External links
Official website

Kharaitiyat SC
Sports clubs established in 1996
1996 establishments in Qatar